William Horton (17 February 1905 – 19 January 1992) was an English professional rugby league footballer who played in the 1920s and 1930s.

Background
Bill Horton was born in Knottingley, Wakefield, West Riding of Yorkshire, England, and he died aged 86.

Playing career

International honours
Bill Horton won caps for England while at Wakefield Trinity in 1928 against Wales, in 1929 against Other Nationalities, in 1932 against Wales, in 1933 against Australia, in 1936 against Wales, and won caps for Great Britain while at Wakefield Trinity in 1928 against Australia (3 matches), New Zealand (3 matches), in 1929-30 against Australia, in 1932 against Australia (3 matches), New Zealand, and in 1933 against Australia (3 matches).

County honours
Bill Horton won cap(s) for Yorkshire while at Wakefield Trinity.

County Cup Final appearances
Bill Horton played right-, i.e. number 12, in Wakefield Trinity's 9-8 victory over Batley in the 1924–25 Yorkshire County Cup Final during the 1924–25 season at Headingley Rugby Stadium, Leeds on Saturday 22 November 1924, played right- in the 3-10 defeat by Huddersfield in the 1926–27 Yorkshire County Cup Final during the 1926–27 season at Headingley Rugby Stadium, Leeds on Wednesday 1 December 1926, played left-, i.e. number 11, in the 0-8 defeat by Leeds in the 1932–33 Yorkshire County Cup Final during the 1932–33 season at Fartown Ground, Huddersfield on Saturday 19 November 1932, played left- in the 5-5 draw with Leeds in the 1934–35 Yorkshire County Cup Final during the 1934–35 season at Crown Flatt, Dewsbury on Saturday 27 October 1934, played left- in the 2-2 draw with Leeds in the 1934–35 Yorkshire County Cup Final replay during the 1934–35 season at Fartown Ground, Huddersfield on Wednesday 31 October 1934, played left- in the 0-13 defeat by Leeds in the 1934–35 Yorkshire County Cup Final second replay during the 1934–35 season at Parkside, Hunslet on Wednesday 7 November 1934, and played left- in the 2-9 defeat by York in the 1936–37 Yorkshire County Cup Final during the 1936–37 season at Headingley Rugby Stadium, Leeds on Saturday 17 October 1936.

Notable tour matches
Bill Horton played left-, i.e. number 11, in Wakefield Trinity's 6-17 defeat by Australia in the 1933–34 Kangaroo tour of Great Britain match during the 1933–34 season at Belle Vue, Wakefield on Saturday 28 October 1933.

Club career
Bill Horton made his début for Wakefield Trinity during August 1924, he played his last match for Wakefield Trinity during the 1937–38 season, and he appears to have scored no drop-goals (or field-goals as they are currently known in Australasia), but prior to the 1974–75 season all goals, whether; conversions, penalties, or drop-goals, scored 2-points, consequently prior to this date drop-goals were often not explicitly documented, therefore '0' drop-goals may indicate drop-goals not recorded, rather than no drop-goals scored. In addition, prior to the 1949–50 season, the archaic field-goal was also still a valid means of scoring points.

Genealogical information
Bill Horton married Sybil Irene (née Webber) (birth registered during second ¼ 1903 in Bristol district – death unknown) during June 1927 in Wakefield. They had children; John A. Horton (birth registered during first ¼ 1928 in Wakefield district).

References

Lindley, John (1960). Dreadnoughts - A HISTORY OF Wakefield Trinity F. C. 1873 - 1960. John Lindley Son & Co Ltd. ISBN n/a

External links
Knottingley In 1968 - 25 July 1968 - Aire Street History
RootsWeb > Archiver > WEST-RIDING > 1999-03 > 0920940220
RootsWeb > Archiver > WEST-RIDING > 1999-03 > 0922827299
RootsWeb > Archiver > KILBURN-UK > 2002-01 > 1010751181
(archived by web.archive.org) Green & Gold makes its début

1905 births
1992 deaths
England national rugby league team players
English rugby league players
Great Britain national rugby league team players
Place of death missing
Rugby league locks
Rugby league players from Wakefield
Rugby league second-rows
Sportspeople from Knottingley
Wakefield Trinity captains
Wakefield Trinity players
Yorkshire rugby league team players